The Little Sister is an American silent film produced by Kalem Company and directed by Sidney Olcott with Gene Gauntier, Robert Vignola and Jack J. Clark.

Cast
 Gene Gauntier  
 Robert Vignola 
 Jack J. Clark

Production notes
The film was shot in Jacksonville, Florida.

External links

 The Little Sister website dedicated to Sidney Olcott

1911 films
Silent American drama films
American silent short films
Films set in Florida
Films shot in Jacksonville, Florida
Films directed by Sidney Olcott
1911 short films
1911 drama films
American black-and-white films
1910s American films